Debi may refer to:

People
 Anurupa Debi (1882–1958), Indian writer
 Debi Prasad Roy Chowdhury
 Debi Austin (1950–2013), American anti-smoking advocate
 Debi Carson
 Debi Derryberry, American voice actress
 Debi Diamond (born 1965), American adult actress
 Debi Doss, American photographer and singer
 Debi Edward, British television broadcaster
 Debi Ghosal, Indian politician
 Debi Gliori (born 1959), British writer and illustrator
 Debi Jones (born 1958)
 Debi Laszewski (born 1969), American bodybuilder
 Debi Mae West, American voice actress
 Debi Nova, Costa Rican singer-songwriter
 Debi Prasad Pal (1927–2021)
 Debi Prasad Sarkar (born 1958), Indian biochemist
 Debi Prasanna Pattanayak (born 1931), Indian linguist
 Debi Purcell
 Debi Rose, American politician
 Debi Roy (born 1940)
 Debi Singh Tewatia (1930–2017)
 Debi Smith, American folk singer-songwriter
 Debi Soren, Indian politician
 Debi Sue Voorhees
 Debi Thomas
 Debi Towns (born 1956), American politician

Other
 Debi (2005 film)
 Debi (2018 film)

See also
 Debbie